Barkhalbina is a village in the Zaqatala Rayon of Azerbaijan.

References 

Populated places in Zaqatala District